Francisco Javier Cortéz Rodríguez (born September 20, 1985) is a Mexican football manager and former player.

References

1985 births
Living people
Association football midfielders
Correcaminos UAT footballers
Mexican football managers
Footballers from Tamaulipas
People from Ciudad Victoria
Mexican footballers